Samaj Ko Badal Dalo (Change This World) is a 1947 Indian Hindi social melodrama film directed by Vijay Bhatt. Produced under the Prakash Pictures banner, its music composer was Khemchand Prakash, with lyrics by Pandit Indra, Roopdas, and Qamar Jalalabadi. The story, screenplay and dialogues were by Pandit Girish. Its cinematographer was Yusuf Mulji and the film starred Arun Ahuja, Mridula, Yakub, Leela Pawar, Umakant and Bikram Kapoor.

Bhatt's social film dealt with the issue of "mismatched" marriages and advocated divorce, setting a partner free in order to choose their own mate. Samaj Ko Badal Dalo (1970) is a film of the same name directed by V. Madhusudan Rao and produced by Gemini, however it had no relation to the 1947 film, but was instead a remake of A. Vincent's award-winning Malayalam film, Thulabharam (1968).

Plot
Kishore (Arun) and Manorama (Mridula) are in love, but unable to get married. Mridula's father is a clerk, who can't afford to pay the dowry demanded by Arun's family. Jayant (Yakub) is a widower, and Mridula is married off to him. His cruel behaviour becomes apparent when he starts torturing Mridula soon after their marriage. Arun's parents get him married to the rich Champa (Leela Pawar), who is in love with someone else. Arun helps her marry Naresh, the man she loves, by giving her a divorce. Arun watches the torture inflicted on Mridula and the story then continues through tense scenes where eventually Arun kills Jayant and unwittingly Mridula, too, following which he's sent to a mental asylum having been declared insane.

Cast
 Arun as Kishore
 Mridula Rani as Manorama
 Yakub as Jayant
 Leela Pawar as Champa 
 Umakant
 Bikram Kapoor
 Prem Dhawan
 Ramesh Sinha
 Shabnam
 Mohammed Rafi

Crew
The film's crew consisted of:
 Directed: Vijay Bhatt
 Produced: Vijay Bhatt 
 Story: Pandit Girish
 Screenplay: Pandit Girish
 Dialogue: Pandit Girish
 Cinematography: Yusuf Mulji
 Choreography:	Sachin Shankar, Sharad Shukla
 Editing: Pratap Dave
 Art Direction: M. V. Dubashe, B. M. Shukla
 Audiography: T. K. Dave
 Music: Khemchand Prakash
 Lyrics: Pandit Indra, Roopdas, Qamar Jalalabadi

Soundtrack
Samaj Ko Badal Dalo was one of the early films for which Mohammed Rafi recorded songs in Bombay. The others were Gaon Ki Gori (1945) and Jugnu (1947). The music direction was by Khemchand Prakash, with lyrics by Pandit Indra, Roopdas and Qamar Jalabadi. The playback singers were Mohammed Rafi, Manna Dey, Arun Kumar Ahuja and Amirbai Karnataki.

Song List

References

External links

1947 films
1940s Hindi-language films
1947 drama films
Films directed by Vijay Bhatt
Indian drama films
Films scored by Khemchand Prakash
Melodrama films
Indian black-and-white films
Hindi-language drama films